The Embassy of the Philippines in Buenos Aires is the diplomatic mission of the Republic of the Philippines to the Argentine Republic. First opened in 1949 as the first Philippine diplomatic mission in Latin America, it is currently located in the barrio of Palermo in northern Buenos Aires, near its Chinatown.

History
Diplomatic relations between Argentina and the Philippines were established on August 21, 1948, with Narciso Ramos, who would later become Secretary of Foreign Affairs, being appointed as minister to Argentina by President Elpidio Quirino, alongside former member of the Philippine Legislature Manuel Escudero, who was appointed as first secretary and consul general. A legation was then opened on April 4, 1949, the first Philippine mission in Latin America, initially operating from the Plaza Hotel Buenos Aires.

The mission was later upgraded to a full embassy in 1960, with former Representative Pedro Gil, who had been appointed by Quirino's successor, Ramon Magsaysay, as minister in 1956, becoming the first resident Philippine ambassador to Argentina.

Chancery
On September 29, 2020, the Embassy released bidding documents indicating that it had acquired a new building, located on Calle 11 de Septiembre de 1888 in neighboring Palermo, to serve as the mission's new chancery, which was funded through that year's Philippine national budget.

The land on which the chancery now stands was originally part of a vast estate owned by the family of José Pedro Ernesto Tornquist, a German-born property developer whose son, Ernesto, was one of the most prominent businessmen in Argentina during his time. The estate was later subdivided, and the corner lot was acquired by Tomás Finochietto and Ana Chammás, immigrants from Genoa who arrived in Argentina at the end of the 19th century. It would then pass on to their children, including , who would later become the family doctor of Argentine President Juan Domingo Perón and his wife, Eva.

The building was built in 1930 to serve as the Finochietto family home, the brainchild of Susana Edelmira Finochietto y Fernández, daughter of noted surgeon Enrique Finochietto, Ricardo's brother, and her husband Julián Tristán Arabehety. In 2009, it was catalogued and listed as part of the urban heritage of Buenos Aires, and the property was acquired by the Philippine government in 2019, during the ambassadorship of Linglingay F. Lacanlale. The Embassy later budgeted around $1.31 million to renovate the property, as well as an additional $275,000 for new fixtures, furniture and equipment. Contracting the Buenos Aires-based firm Adamo-Faiden Architects to execute the project, renovation work was completed the following year.

Although the Embassy relocated to the new chancery on August 2, 2021, it was not inaugurated until May 20, 2022, with the inauguration led by Foreign Affairs Undersecretary Ma. Theresa P. Lazaro. Lazaro was joined at the inauguration by her Argentine counterpart, Claudio Javier Rosencwaig, and Ambassador Lacanlale. The event also served as the diplomatic reception commemorating the 124th anniversary of Philippine independence.

Originally constructed in the French Neoclassical style that was popular in Argentina at the end of the 19th century, the property was renovated to conform to the requirements of a modern chancery although many original features were kept, including the façade, the original wooden doors and grand staircase, and fixtures made of Carrara marble by the entrance and back stairs. The fence, meanwhile, is a new addition with a design inspired by ikat weaving patterns indigenous to the Philippines.

Staff and activities

Her Excellency Grace T. Cruz Fabella  presented her open copy of letter of credence as Ambassador Extraordinary and Plenipotentiary of the Republic of the Philippines to Dr. Maria Jimena Rivero, the National Director for Ceremonials of the Argentine Republic's Ministry of Foreign Affairs, International Trade, and Worship, on 7 March 2023. Her appointment was confirmed by the Commission of Appointments on 28 September 2023. She has concurrent non-resident Ambassador jurisdiction over the Plurinational State of Bolivia, Republic of Paraguay, and Oriental Republic of Uruguay. Her foremost priorities include organizing commemorative activities to celebrate 75 years of Philippine-Argentina bilateral relations on 27 August 2023.

Many of the Embassy's activities center around promoting Filipino culture and strengthening the deep cultural ties between the Philippines and the other countries under its jurisdiction. These include promoting the practice of arnis in the country in 2007, facilitating a series of concerts by the University of the Philippines Madrigal Singers in 2011, organizing a benefit dinner for victims of Typhoon Yolanda (Haiyan) in 2013, and hosting an exhibit on Philippine textiles at the Fondo Nacional de las Artes in 2019. It also collaborates with the other Southeast Asian missions in Argentina to promote the region as a whole: in 2015, the Embassy led in organizing a festival promoting Southeast Asian cultures at Plaza Barrancas in Belgrano, and the next year participated in festivities celebrating the 63rd anniversary of the Federación Económica de Tucumán. In addition to activities in Argentina, the Embassy exercises jurisdiction in Bolivia, Paraguay and Uruguay, where it maintains honorary consulates.
Argentina–Philippines relations
List of diplomatic missions of the Philippines

References

External links

Official website of the Philippine Embassy in Buenos Aires

P
B